Bob Levy (born August 12, 1962) is an American stand-up comedian, radio personality, writer, actor, and former semi-professional wrestler. He is the host of The Bob Levy Show  and the  Out of the Coffin podcast, and co-host of Kevin Brennan's Misery Loves Company podcast.

Early life
Levy was born in Brooklyn, New York and moved to Staten Island at age six. He dropped out of high school after six years and worked several jobs, including landscaping and painting. For a brief period, he was a semi-professional wrestler under the name "Heartbreaker" Bobby Slayer.

Career

The Howard Stern Show (1990-2010)
Levy wasn't a fan of comedy until he started listening to The Howard Stern Show in 1990, for which he started to send jokes and song parodies that he had written. Levy then started to attend open mic nights hosted by the show's writer, Jackie Martling. Levy recalled that he was unpaid for the first year of doing stand-up. Later on, Martling gave Levy the nickname "The Reverend"; Levy recalled: "Because I was a filthy fuckin' pig, and he wanted to call me the opposite of what I was doing onstage".

By 2001, Levy had appeared on Comedy's Dirtiest Dozen, performed at Woodstock '94, and had opened for the Edgar Winter Group and Bachman Turner Overdrive.

In 2002, Levy entered himself in the World's Meanest Listener contest held on The Howard Stern Show which increased his profile. He submitted clips of himself roasting Stern and the staff which were well received and made him a top three finalist. In 2004, he was one of the contestants on "Get John's Job" contest. He was one of the hosts of The Killers of Comedy Tour, a comedy tour featuring several of the show's guests and staffers, which included Jim Florentine, Beetlejuice, and The Iron Sheik. When the show moved to SiriusXM in 2006, Levy was the host of the show's series of live comedy roasts.

From 2006 to 2010, Levy was co-host of the weekly comedy show Miserable Men on Howard 101 on SiriusXM Radio.

In December 2007, Levy opened Levy's Comedy Club at the Ramada Inn in Levittown, Pennsylvania.

In 2008, Levy took part in a boxing match with Danny Bonaduce, losing to Bonaduce by a TKO in the second one-minute round of a planned three-round fight.

Post Howard Stern Show (2011-2014)
In 2014, Levy was the host of Ears Wide Open with co-hosts Stacey Prussman and Joe Conte. It aired on WILC-AM in Washington, D.C. and WUFC-AM in Boston.

The Bob Levy Show (2015-present)
Levy started the comedic podcast titled The Bob Levy Show in September 2015. The show moved to the Radio Misfits Podcast Network in October 2015.

Other ventures
Until 2008, Levy was a writer and regular on Kidd Chris's morning radio show on WYSP in Philadelphia. Levy also opened a weekend comedy club in Levittown, Pennsylvania and three other comedy clubs in Easton, Florida.

Levy is the former host of Rising with "The Reverend" Bob Levy with co-hosts Will Bozarth and John Kensil, on WNJC-AM in Philadelphia. 

Since November 2020, Levy has hosted the  Levyland  podcast with co - hosts Rob Saul and Chris Ables. 

Levy is a regular on fellow comedian Kevin Brennan's Misery Loves Company podcast.

In October 2022, Levy, along with Brennan, opened a comedy club called Brennan & Levy's Comedy Loft in Vineland, New Jersey.

Levy is also co-host of  The BS Show with Shuli Egar and a regular on the  Uncle Rico Podcast hosted by Shuli and comedian/writer Mike Morse. Both shows are part of The Shuli Network.

Personal life
In 2006, Levy divorced his wife. He has a son, Dominic. In 2018, Levy remarried.

References

External links
 
 The Bob Levy Show
 Brennan & Levy's Comedy Loft at Kaycee Ray's

1962 births
Living people
20th-century American comedians
21st-century American comedians
21st-century American Jews
American male comedians
American radio personalities
Comedians from New Jersey
Jewish American male comedians
People from Deptford Township, New Jersey
People from Staten Island
Sirius Satellite Radio